Sean Phillips is a comic books artist.

Sean, Shawn or Shaun Phil(l)ips may also refer to:

Sean Phillips, voice over actor
Sean Phillips (cricketer) (born 1980), South African cricketer
Sean Phillips (visual effects artist), special effects artist

Others
Shawn Phillips, musician
Shaun Phillips, American football player